Venera 1 ( meaning Venus 1), also known as Venera-1VA No.2 and occasionally in the West as Sputnik 8 was the first spacecraft to fly past Venus, as part of the Soviet Union's Venera programme. Launched in February 1961, it flew past Venus on 19 May of the same year; however, radio contact with the probe was lost before the flyby, resulting in it returning no data.

Spacecraft
Venera 1 was a  probe consisting of a cylindrical body  in diameter topped by a dome, totalling  in height. Two solar panels extended from the cylinder, charging a bank of silver-zinc batteries. A  parabolic wire-mesh antenna was designed to send data from Venus to Earth on a frequency of 922.8 MHz. A  antenna boom was used to transmit short-wave signals during the near-Earth phase of the mission. Semidirectional quadrupole antennas mounted on the solar panels provided routine telemetry and telecommand contact with Earth during the mission, on a circularly-polarized decimetre radio band.

The probe was equipped with scientific instruments including a flux-gate magnetometer attached to the antenna boom, two ion traps to measure solar wind, micrometeorite detectors, and Geiger counter tubes and a sodium iodide scintillator for measurement of cosmic radiation. An experiment attached to one solar panel measured temperatures of experimental coatings. Infrared and/or ultraviolet radiometers may have been included. The dome contained a KDU-414 engine used for mid-course corrections. Temperature control was achieved by motorized thermal shutters.

During most of its flight, Venera 1 was spin stabilized. It was the first spacecraft designed to perform mid-course corrections, by entering a mode of 3-axis stabilization, fixing on the Sun and the star Canopus. Had it reached Venus, it would have entered another mode of 3-axis stabilization, fixing on the Sun and Earth, and using for the first time a parabolic antenna to relay data.

Launch
Venera 1 was the second of two attempts to launch a probe to Venus in February 1961, immediately following the launch of its sister ship Venera-1VA No.1, which failed to leave Earth orbit. Soviet experts launched Venera-1 using a Molniya carrier rocket from the Baikonur Cosmodrome. The launch took place at 00:34:36 GMT on 12 February 1961.

The spacecraft, along with the rocket's Blok-L upper stage, was initially placed into a  low Earth orbit, before the upper stage fired to place "Venera 1" into a heliocentric orbit, directed towards Venus. The 11D33 engine was the world's first staged-combustion-cycle rocket engine, and also the first use of an ullage engine to allow a liquid-fuel rocket engine to start in space.

Failure
After discovering the solar wind with Luna 2, Venera 1 provided the first verification that this plasma was uniformly present in deep space. Seven days later, the next scheduled telemetry session failed to occur. On May 19, 1961, Venera 1 passed within  of Venus. With the help of the British radio telescope at Jodrell Bank, some weak signals from Venera 1 may have been detected in June. Soviet engineers believed that Venera 1 failed due to the overheating of a solar-direction sensor.

See also

List of missions to Venus
Mariner 2
Timeline of planetary exploration

References

External links 

The Soviet Exploration of Venus
NSSDC Master Catalog - Venera 1

Venera program

Spacecraft launched in 1961
Derelict space probes
Derelict satellites in heliocentric orbit
1961 in the Soviet Union
1MV